Tumi Masekela (born 21 July 1987) is a South African first-class cricketer who plays for the Knights cricket team.

References

External links
 

1987 births
Living people
South African cricketers
Knights cricketers
People from Polokwane
Sportspeople from Limpopo